There are hundreds of published Boholano writers (or Bol-anon writers) from the time Boholano literature emerged since the time of Boholano priestess Karyapa before the arrival of the Spaniards. The following list of Boholano writers is not extensive nor comprehensive enough to be considered a directory.

Several groups were formed like Bahandi Writers of Loon, Bohol, Kaliwat ni Karyapa formed on September 8, 2000 and Society of Active Boholano Artists and Writers.

Also named in the list are the late president of the Republic of the Philippines Carlos P. Garcia who wrote Visayan poems, Palanca awardees Marjorie Evasco, Noel P. Tuazon, and Clovis Nazareno and the Boholano dean of journalism the late Zoilo Dejaresco.

List of Boholano writers
This is a partial, alphabetical list of Boholano writers who lived or are living in the Philippines and other countries. The town and/or province where the writer was born or is currently residing is indicated in parentheses after his/her name. Overseas writers temporarily working or permanently residing abroad have their Philippine provinces of origin and/or adopted countries cited. The (†) symbol after a writer's name signifies that he/she is deceased.

A
 Erico B. Aumentado (Tagbilaran) (†)
 Fred Amora (Tagbilaran)
 Gisela Mae Apalisok (Texas, United States)
 Alma Maria Apalisok-Bandillo (Tagbilaran)
 Salvador Apalisok (†)
 Simplicio Apalisok (†)
 Fr. Simplicio Apalisok Jr.
 Gloria Sevilla - Andaleon (Loon)
 Eutropio Valdehueza Apalisok (Loay) (+)

B
 Michael Bagaipo (Tagbilaran)
 Eddie Babor (Tagbilaran) (†)
 Ramon Boloron
 Danilo Bantugan
 Cristifil Baluma
 June Socorro Blanco (Tagbilaran)
 May Blanco (Tagbilaran)
 Paul Borja
 Rolando Butalid (Tagbilaran)
 Gertrude Biliran (Loboc/Tagbilaran)
 Roberto Buena Jr. (London)
 Fulgencio "Pol" Lecias Bulilan (Loon)

C
 Jonathan Carnice (Loon)
 F. Jordan Carnice (Loon + Tagbilaran)  
 Fr. Aloysius L. Cartagenas (Loon)
 Roy Cimagala
 Jorge Cabalit (Tagbilaran)
 Alan Cajes (Batuan)
 Perla Pesudas - Cagulada (Loon)
 Orlando Cajegas (Loon)
 Michael Cañares
 Mariano Cornito (Loon)

D
 Zoilo Dejaresco (Tagbilaran)
 Bingo Dejaresco (Tagbilaran)  
 Peter Dejaresco (Tagbilaran) 
 Eli Dejaresco (Tagbilaran)

E
 Arvin C. Escatron/RV Escatron (Pilar & Dumaguete)
 Marjorie Evasco (Maribojoc) 
 Dwight B. Ebojo (Dauis)

F
 Ariel Fullido
 Chito Fuentes

G
 Edgar Godin (Loon)
 Ciriaco Guingguing (†)
 Fiel Angeli Espejo Araoarao-Gabin (Panglao & Tagbilaran)
 Carlos P. Garcia (Talibon) (†) 
 Irvin Garsuta

H

I
 Chrisylli Mitzi Ibaya (Tagbilaran)
 Anthony Incon (†)
 Jonathan Ingcol (Loon) (†)

J

K

L
 Sonieta Labasan (Tagbilaran)
 Jose Lacaba or (Pete Lacaba) (Loon) 
 Emmanuel Lacaba (Loon) (Eman Lacaba) (†)
 Maria Asuncion Robles - Larido (Loon) 
 Jose Marimel R. Laniba (Loon)
 Joaquin Ligumbres (Loon) (†)
 Michael Ligalig
 Mitzi Lungay (Tagbilaran)
 Alexander Lim
 Alexis Lim
 Marianito Luspo (Dauis)
 Reynald R. Luminarias (Loon)
 Jose Z. Lugo (Loon)
 Lutgardo "Gardy" L. Labad (Baclayon)

M
 Edeliza Macalandag (Danao + Tagbilaran) 
 Jeremias Tubal Mejorada (Loon) (†)
 Reigh Monreal (Loon)
 Melchor Monreal (Loon) (†)
 Jurey Pesudas Mirafuentes (Loon)

N
 Argosy Segovia Nazareno (Loon)
 Clovis Lopez Nazareno (Loon) (†)

O
 Mario Ombao

P
 Rene Eune Pueblos Ponte (Loon)
 Loy Palapos
 Cecilio Putong (†)

Q
 Bonifacio Quirog (Dimiao)
 Ludwig Bon Migriño Quirog (Tagbilaran)

R
 Webon Relator (Loon) 
 Lina Sagaral Reyes (Loay)
 Jose Ma. Rocha (Tagbilaran) (†)
 Justino Romea (Loon) (†)
 Godofredo Roperos (Loon)

S
 Adam L. Saligumba (Loon)
 Rowena Seloterio (Tagbilaran)
 Rose Rara - Sarabosing (Loboc)
 Justiniano Lopez Seroy (Loon) (†)

T
 Bennelyn Tutor 
 Noel P. Tuazon (Dauis)
 Jes Tirol (Tagbilaran)
 Vida May Tirol (Candijay & Tagbilaran)

U
 Dr. Ulysses Aparace

V
 Paul Joseph J. Vistal (Tagbilaran)
 John Titus J. Vistal (Tagbilaran)

W

X

Y

Z

References

See also
 Cebuano literature
 GUMIL Filipinas
 Literature of the Philippines

 
Filipino journalists
Filipino television personalities
Filipino writers
Gossip columnists
Philippine literature